= Constituency W-314 =

Provincial constituency of Punjab, Pakistan

W-314
- Woman Reserved constituency for the Provincial Assembly of Punjab

Current constituency

Constituency W-314 is a reserved constituency for women in the Provincial Assembly of Punjab in Pakistan.

== See also ==
- Punjab, Pakistan
